Bolívar Canton is one of the cantons of Bolívar Province, Bolivia.

Cantons of Bolivia
Cantons of Cochabamba Department